A multimedia library is a public institution functioning as a library, containing not only paper and electronic books, newspapers and magazines, but also multimedia materials like videos (movies, documentaries) and sound recordings (music, audio books).

A multimedia library is distinct from a hybrid library, which – sensu stricto – contains only books and e-books. Multimedia, by definition, includes also pre-digital non-book materials.

Notable examples 
 Sendai Mediatheque, Japan (founded 2001)
 , Merano, Italy (founded 2002)

See also 
 cinematheque (film archive)

References

Libraries by type
Types of library